Rieth is a German surname. Notable people with the surname include:

Bill Rieth (1916–1999), American football player
Glenn K. Rieth (born 1957), American soldier
Hermann Rieth, German opera singer

See also
Andreas Rieth Homestead, historic home in Pennsylvania

German-language surnames